General (Ret.) Yoga Sugama (12 May 1925 – 23 April 2003) was the head of Bakin, doubling as KasKopkamtib (1980–1989). He also served as Ambassador of Indonesia to the United Nations. Yoga died in Jakarta Pondok Indah Hospital, and his remains were interred in TMP Kalibata.

1925 births
2003 deaths